A N D is the second studio album by Japanese math rock band Tricot. It was released on March 18, 2015 by the band's own label Bakuretsu Records. The album was released internationally by Topshelf Records on April 13, 2018.

Track listing

Personnel
Credits are adapted from the album's liner notes.

Tricot
 Motoko "Motifour" Kida – guitar, backing vocals
 Ikkyu Nakajima – vocals, guitar
 Hiromi "Hirohiro" Sagane – bass, backing vocals

Additional musicians
 Bobo – drums (tracks 3, 7)
 H Zett M – piano and electric piano (tracks 7, 11)
 Toshiki Hata – drums (tracks 1, 4)
 Kazutaka Komaki – drums (track 10)
 Muneomi Senju – drums (tracks 2, 6)
 Kousuke Wakiyama – drums and percussion (tracks 5, 11)
 Miyoko Yamaguchi – drums (tracks 8, 9, 12)

Production
 Hiroshi Ikeda – recording, mixing
 Masayuki Nakano – recording, mixing
 Akihiro Shiba – mastering

Design
 Misato Ishihara – design
 Toshimitsu Koda – photography
 Tetsuro Shima – hair, makeup

Charts

References

External links
 
 

2015 albums
Tricot (band) albums